Tom Powers was an actor.

Tom Powers may also refer to:

Tom Powers (racing driver), former NASCAR driver
Tom Powers, the fictional gangster played by James Cagney in The Public Enemy
Tom Powers, a character in Tree Fu Tom
Tom Powers, a notorious gambler and a friend of Pat Garrett

See also
Thomas Powers (disambiguation)
Tom Power (1869–1898), American baseball player
Tom Power (musician) (born 1987), Canadian musician and radio presenter